UKM Komuter station is a KTM Komuter train station situated close to and named after the National University of Malaysia in Bangi, Hulu Langat District, Selangor, Malaysia.

The station is a small two-platform train halt served by the KTM Komuter Seremban Line train services, with an operational ticket counter and two ticket vending machines. The station has seen the addition of a new extension to the building.

The station halt is located on the northeast tip of the university's grounds, 1.5 km from the university's academics compound. The university's club house (with an 18-hole golf course and a swimming pool) and driving range are located immediately close to the station. Bus services are provided to carry passengers between the station and the university.

Because of its location close to the National University, the station typically receives many passengers (mostly university students) on Fridays and during the weekends.

External links
 UKM KTM Komuter Station

Hulu Langat District
Railway stations in Selangor
Seremban Line